Janowo may refer to the following places in Poland:
Janowo, Lower Silesian Voivodeship (south-west Poland)
Janowo, Aleksandrów County in Kuyavian-Pomeranian Voivodeship (north-central Poland)
Janowo, Brodnica County in Kuyavian-Pomeranian Voivodeship (north-central Poland)
Janowo, Bydgoszcz County in Kuyavian-Pomeranian Voivodeship (north-central Poland)
Janowo, Lipno County in Kuyavian-Pomeranian Voivodeship (north-central Poland)
Janowo, Nakło County in Kuyavian-Pomeranian Voivodeship (north-central Poland)
Janowo, Gmina Boniewo in Kuyavian-Pomeranian Voivodeship (north-central Poland)
Janowo, Gmina Choceń in Kuyavian-Pomeranian Voivodeship (north-central Poland)
Janowo, Grajewo County in Podlaskie Voivodeship (north-east Poland)
Janowo, Gmina Narew in Podlaskie Voivodeship (north-east Poland)
Janowo, Gmina Narewka in Podlaskie Voivodeship (north-east Poland)
Janowo, Kolno County in Podlaskie Voivodeship (north-east Poland)
Janowo, Łomża County in Podlaskie Voivodeship (north-east Poland)
Janowo, Ciechanów County in Masovian Voivodeship (east-central Poland)
Janowo, Nowy Dwór Mazowiecki County in Masovian Voivodeship (east-central Poland)
Janowo, Ostrów Mazowiecka County in Masovian Voivodeship (east-central Poland)
Janowo, Węgrów County in Masovian Voivodeship (east-central Poland)
Janowo, Wyszków County in Masovian Voivodeship (east-central Poland)
Janowo, Konin County in Greater Poland Voivodeship (west-central Poland)
Janowo, Rawicz County in Greater Poland Voivodeship (west-central Poland)
Janowo, Słupca County in Greater Poland Voivodeship (west-central Poland)
Janowo, Gmina Środa Wielkopolska in Greater Poland Voivodeship (west-central Poland)
Janowo, Gmina Dominowo in Greater Poland Voivodeship (west-central Poland)
Janowo, Lubusz Voivodeship (west Poland)
Janowo, Bytów County in Pomeranian Voivodeship (north Poland)
Janowo, Kartuzy County in Pomeranian Voivodeship (north Poland)
Janowo, Kwidzyn County in Pomeranian Voivodeship (north Poland)
Janowo, Malbork County in Pomeranian Voivodeship (north Poland)
Janowo, Starogard County in Pomeranian Voivodeship (north Poland)
Janowo, Tczew County in Pomeranian Voivodeship (north Poland)
Janowo, Działdowo County in Warmian-Masurian Voivodeship (north Poland)
Janowo, Elbląg County in Warmian-Masurian Voivodeship (north Poland)
Janowo, Gołdap County in Warmian-Masurian Voivodeship (north Poland)
Janowo, Iława County in Warmian-Masurian Voivodeship (north Poland)
Janowo, Mrągowo County in Warmian-Masurian Voivodeship (north Poland)
Janowo, Nidzica County in Warmian-Masurian Voivodeship (north Poland)
Janowo, Ostróda County in Warmian-Masurian Voivodeship (north Poland)
Janowo, Gryfice County in West Pomeranian Voivodeship (north-west Poland)
Janowo, Myślibórz County in West Pomeranian Voivodeship (north-west Poland)
Janowo, Pyrzyce County in West Pomeranian Voivodeship (north-west Poland)
Janowo, Szczecinek County in West Pomeranian Voivodeship (north-west Poland)
Gmina Janowo, Nidzica County, Warmian-Masurian Voivodeship, in northern Poland